Xiuying railway station is a railway station on the Hainan eastern ring high-speed railway, serving the Xiuying district, located in Hainan, China. The station was opened on July 1, 2019.

References

External links

Railway stations in Hainan
Railway stations in China opened in 2019